The 1990 United States Senate election in Montana took place on November 6, 1990. Incumbent United States Senator Max Baucus, who was first elected in 1978 and was re-elected in 1984, ran for re-election. After winning the Democratic primary, he moved on to the general election, where he was opposed by Allen Kolstad, the Lieutenant Governor of Montana and the Republican nominee. Baucus ultimately ended up defeating Kolstad in a landslide, winning his third term with ease.

Democratic primary

Candidates 
 Max Baucus, incumbent United States Senator
John Driscoll, former Speaker of the Montana House of Representatives
 "Curly" Thornton

Results

Republican primary

Candidates 
 Allen Kolstad, Lieutenant Governor of Montana
 Bruce Vorhauer, businessman
 Bill Farrell
 John Domenech

Results

General election

Results

See also 
 1990 United States Senate elections

References 

Montana
1990
1990 Montana elections